Westmark School is a private school in Encino, California, teaching 2nd through 12th grade. The school serves children with language-based learning differences including attention-deficit disorder and dyslexia among other learning disorders.

The school is the first in the Los Angeles area to provide iPads to all students. School administrators and teachers consider the high costs worth it for what it adds to the education program. Westmark has a television station education program in which its 5th grade students write the material and produce the program. The school library has materials of various types to cater to the students with various learning needs.

References

External links
 Westmark School website

1983 establishments in California
Educational institutions established in 1983
Encino, Los Angeles
High schools in Los Angeles
Private elementary schools in California
Private high schools in California
Private middle schools in California